The 1974 Kerry Senior Football Championship was the 74th staging of the Kerry Senior Football Championship since its establishment by the Kerry County Board in 1889.

Austin Stacks entered the championship as the defending champions.

The final was played on 3 November 1974 at Austin Stack Park in Tralee, between Kenmare and Shannon Rangers, in what was their first ever meeting in the final. Kenmare won the match by 2-12 to 1-05 to claim their first ever championship title.

Results

Final

Championship statistics

Miscellaneous

 Kenmare District win the title for the first time.

References

Kerry Senior Football Championship
1974 in Gaelic football